Skully Thembeni Nxangisa is a South African politician who served in the Free State Executive Council as the Member of the Executive Council (MEC) for Cooperative Governance and Traditional Affairs from May 2019 until October 2021, when he became the MEC for  Agriculture and Rural Development. He was removed from the executive council in March 2023

Political career
Nxangisa is a member of the African National Congress. For the provincial election on 8 May 2019, he was placed 8th on the ANC's provincial list. The ANC managed to win 19 seats in the provincial legislature and Nxangisa was sworn in as an MPL, when the legislature reconvened on 22 May 2019.

On 28 May, premier Sisi Ntombela announced her new Executive Council for the sixth administration. She appointed Nxangisa MEC for Cooperative Governance and Traditional Affairs. He was sworn in later that same day.

On 1 October 2021, Nxangisa was appointed as MEC for Agriculture and Rural Development by Ntombela. On 14 March 2023, Nxangisa was removed as MEC for Agriculture and Rural Development and excluded from the executive council entirely by newly elected premier Mxolisi Dukwana; his successor is yet to be determined.

Personal life
Nxangisa tested positive for COVID-19 on 25 July 2020.

References

External links
Thembeni Nxangisa, Mr – South African Government
Skully Thembeni Nxangisa – People's Assembly

Living people
Year of birth missing (living people)
People from the Free State (province)
21st-century South African politicians
African National Congress politicians
Members of the Free State Provincial Legislature